Radioactive is a 2019 British biographical drama film written by Jack Thorne, directed by Marjane Satrapi and starring Rosamund Pike as Marie Curie. The film is based on the 2010 graphic novel Radioactive: Marie & Pierre Curie: A Tale of Love and Fallout by the American artist Lauren Redniss.

The film premiered as the Closing Night Gala at the 2019 Toronto International Film Festival. The film was scheduled to be released in theatres in 2020 but its opening was cancelled due to the COVID-19 pandemic. It was released digitally in the United Kingdom on 15 June 2020 by StudioCanal and released on streaming by Amazon Studios on Amazon Prime Video in the United States on 24 July 2020.

Plot

In 1934, Marie Curie collapses in her laboratory in Paris. As she is rushed to the hospital, she remembers her life. In 1893 she was frequently rejected for funding due to her gender but entered a partnership with Pierre Curie. After Marie discovered polonium and radium, the two fell in love, were married, and had two children. Soon, Marie announces the discovery of radioactivity, revolutionizing physics and chemistry. Radium is soon used in a series of commercial products. Pierre takes Marie to a séance where radium is used to attempt to contact the dead, but Marie disapproves of spiritualism and the idea of an afterlife after the death of her mother in Poland.

Although Pierre rejects the Légion d'honneur for not nominating Marie and insists that the two jointly share their Nobel Prize in Physics, Marie becomes agitated that he accepted the Prize in Stockholm without her. Soon afterwards Pierre becomes increasingly sick with anemia as a result of his research and is trampled to death by a horse. Although she initially dismisses concerns that her elements are toxic, increasing numbers of people die from serious health conditions after exposure to radium. Depressed, she begins an affair with her colleague Paul Langevin. Although she receives Pierre's professorship at the Sorbonne, the French nationalist press reports the details of her affair with Langevin and she is harassed by xenophobic mobs due to her Polish origins. She returns to the house where she attended the seance and tearfully begs her friend, Loie Fuller, who was there to try to use radium to contact Pierre. When she is awarded the Nobel Prize in Chemistry in 1911, she defies the committee's instructions not to travel to Stockholm and is greeted enthusiastically by all the women in attendance.

In 1914, when World War I starts, her daughter Irene convinces her to run an X-ray unit on the Western Front in order to determine whether or not amputation is needed for wounded soldiers; they fund the X-ray diagnostic units by selling her gold Nobel Prize medals to the government. Irene begins dating Frederic Joliot, but Marie disapproves of their relationship because they have been researching Induced radioactivity, and warns Irene not to see him or research radioactivity any more. Although she refuses to obey her, they go to the Western Front together to run the X-ray machine.

Scenes of her life are interwoven with scenes depicting the future impact of her discoveries, including external beam radiotherapy at a hospital in Cleveland in 1956, the atomic bombings of Hiroshima and Nagasaki, a nuclear bomb test in Nevada in 1961, and the Chernobyl disaster in 1986. As she dies in 1934, she sees visions of these events before awakening in a hospital room. Pierre arrives and they leave the hospital together. The film concludes by stating that the Curies' mobile unit X-rayed more than a million men during the war "saving countless lives", that their research would be used to create radiotherapy, and that the Joliot-Curies would discover artificial radioactivity (also known as Induced radioactivity) in 1935.

The movie ends with a photo showing Marie Curie's attendance at the 1927 Solvay Conference with many other celebrated physicists such as Albert Einstein.

Cast
 Rosamund Pike as Marie Curie
 Sam Riley as Pierre Curie
 Sian Brooke as Bronia Sklodowska
 Simon Russell Beale as Gabriel Lippmann
 Anya Taylor-Joy as Irene Curie
 Ariella Glaser as young Irene Curie
Indica Watson as six-year-old Irene Curie
  Cara Bossom as Ève Curie
 Aneurin Barnard as Paul Langevin
  Edward Davis as Frédéric Joliot-Curie
 Katherine Parkinson as Emma Jeanne Desfosses
 Tim Woodward as Alexandre Millerand
 Jonathan Aris as Hetreed
 Mirjam Novak as Nurse Francoise
 Corey Johnson as Adam Warner
 Demetri Goritsas as Dr. Jenkins
 Michael Gould as Judge Clark
 Drew Jacoby as Loie Fuller
 Paul Albertson as Paul Tibbets

Production

Development
It was announced in February 2017 that Marjane Satrapi would direct a biopic on the life of Marie Curie, with StudioCanal and Working Title Films serving as producers. An "autumn 2017" production start was initially foreseen. In May 2017, during the Cannes Film Festival, Rosamund Pike was cast as Curie.

Filming
In February 2018, Amazon Studios acquired the US distribution rights to the film, with filming beginning in the Hungarian cities of Budapest and Esztergom the same week. The cast was rounded out by Sam Riley, Anya Taylor-Joy, Aneurin Barnard and Simon Russell Beale a few days later.

Release
Radioactive premiered as the Closing Night Gala at the Toronto International Film Festival on 14 September 2019. To celebrate International Women's Day, the film's UK premiere took place at the Curzon Mayfair Cinema on 8 March 2020, ahead of its intended 20 March theatrical release, which was cancelled due to the COVID-19 pandemic. StudioCanal eventually released the film in the United Kingdom on digital platforms on 15 June 2020 and through video on demand on 6 July, followed by a DVD release on 27 July. In the United States, where the film was originally set to be released theatrically on 24 April 2020 by Amazon Studios, it was released straight to Amazon Prime Video on 24 July 2020.

Reception

Critical response
The website's critics consensus reads: "Radioactives flawed script and counterproductive storytelling choices are offset by Rosamund Pike's central performance in a sincere tribute to a brilliant scientific mind." On Metacritic, the film has a weighted average score of 56 out of 100, based on 31 critics, indicating "mixed or average reviews".

Deborah Young of The Hollywood Reporter praised Pike's performance, the pacing and the treatment of the subject. The Independent gave it two stars and criticised the "on-the-nose writing that sucks the air out of every scene, as characters ceremoniously announce the film's themes and their personal motivations." Charles Bramesco of The Guardian panned the film as "by-the-numbers", criticising the script and direction, and gave it one star out of five. Kate Taylor of The Globe and Mail concluded that "the viewer may decide [Marie would] rather read a comic book."

Controversy
Although the film is actually based on a 2010 graphic novel, it is marketed as a "biopic" on Marie Curie. Geraldine McGinty of Cornell University severely criticised the film not just for altering many historical events for dramatic effect, but for misrepresenting her character and that of her husband, e.g. by saying that she stayed home rather than attending the 1905 Nobel ceremony with Pierre, where he belatedly delivered the lecture for their 1903 prize. McGinty said that its misleading analogies, misrepresentation of principal characters, and inappropriate nudity and violence, all make it unsuitable as an educational or biographical source.

References

External links
 
 
 

2019 films
2019 biographical drama films
Biographical films about scientists
British biographical drama films
British nonlinear narrative films
Cultural depictions of Pierre Curie
Films about the afterlife
Films about the atomic bombings of Hiroshima and Nagasaki
Films about chemistry
Films about the Chernobyl disaster
Films about Marie Curie
Films about Nobel laureates
Films about physics
Films about sexism
Films directed by Marjane Satrapi
Films not released in theaters due to the COVID-19 pandemic
Films produced by Eric Fellner
Films produced by Tim Bevan
Films set in the 20th century
Films set in 1893
Films set in 1903
Films set in 1914
Films set in 1934
Films set in 1945
Films set in 1956
Films set in 1961
Films set in 1985
Films set in Cleveland
Films set in Chernobyl (city)
Films set in Hiroshima
Films set in Nevada
Films set in Paris
Films set in Poland
Films set in Stockholm
Films shot in Budapest
Films with screenplays by Jack Thorne
Western Front (World War I) films
StudioCanal films
Working Title Films films
Amazon Prime Video original films
2010s English-language films
2010s British films